Hotline Miami is a top-down shooter video game developed by Dennaton Games and published by Devolver Digital for Microsoft Windows. It was by Jonatan Söderström and Dennis Wedin.

Set in 1989 Miami, the game revolves primarily around an unnamed silent protagonist—dubbed "Jacket" by fans—who has been receiving coded messages on his answering machine instructing him to commit massacres against the local Russian mafia. The game blends top-down perspective with stealth, extreme violence and surreal storytelling, along with a soundtrack and visuals inspired by 1980s culture. The game's lead narrative influence was David Lynch, while another notable influence came from the 2011 film Drive for the game's minimalist plot, use of dialogue, portrayal of violence and musical style. The 2006 documentary Cocaine Cowboys influenced the game's setting, and Half-Life series protagonist Gordon Freeman influenced Jacket's lack of voice.

Upon release, Hotline Miami received critical acclaim, with praise regarding its narrative, themes, music and gameplay. It has since been considered to be one of the greatest games of all time, along with being cited as a highly influential independent video game and as a notable cult video game. A sequel, Hotline Miami 2: Wrong Number, was released on 10 March 2015.

Gameplay 
Hotline Miami is divided into several chapters, each of which is further broken down into several stages. At the start of most chapters, "Jacket" wakes up in his apartment and listens to cryptic messages on his answering machine. These messages tell him to perform an arbitrary task at a certain location, which in each case is inferred as a euphemism for killing every person at that location (e.g., "giving VIPs at a hotel a great stay" or "taking care of a pest infestation"). Prior to commencing a mission, the player is asked to select an animal mask to wear, each of which—with the exception of "Richard", the default rooster mask—provides a unique benefit, such as faster movement or a starting weapon.

In each stage, the player navigates a building from a top-down perspective, where the goal is almost always to kill every opponent therein. Occasionally, they must also defeat a boss at the end of the chapter or find key items as they explore. Some levels also include hidden animal masks for the player to find along the way, often in the bodies of other killers who failed the assignment now being undertaken by "Jacket".

By default, the player starts each assignment unarmed, just outside the target location. Most enemies carry a wide variety of melee and ranged weapons which can be collected both from their bodies and the environment. Far outnumbered, the player must rely on their increased awareness (being able to see inside every room within a large radius) and either stealth, overwhelming force or a combination of both to overcome challenges. However, because the player character is no more resilient than enemies, mistakes are often instantly fatal. Despite the game's high lethality, attacks such as punches, weapon throws and door slams merely knock enemies down, prompting the player to gruesomely execute them on the ground. In addition to the more common white suit-wearing mobsters, the player is later pitched against guard dogs, police officers and other opponents that require different strategies to defeat.

Enemy artificial intelligence varies slightly, causing them to occasionally move unpredictably and making it difficult to plan a perfect approach. To make up for this, Hotline Miami allows the player to restart each stage as soon as they die, allowing them to quickly fine-tune their approach over several attempts. At the end of each chapter, the game grades the player's performance based on factors such as speed, variation and recklessness, with high scores unlocking new weapons and additional masks.

Synopsis

Plot 
Hotline Miami takes place in 1989 Miami, where the player takes the role of an unnamed man dubbed "Jacket" by fans for his distinctive letterman jacket. One day, he receives an answering machine message about a supposed delivery of "cookies" to his home. Jacket finds a package outside containing a rooster mask and instructions to perform a hit on the Russian mafia and steal a briefcase in their possession, threatening that he is being watched and that "failure is not an option." After Jacket completes this mission, he receives further messages on his answering machine, each asking him to take care of an innocuous "problem" at a specific address; these locations invariably contain a criminal operation, usually run by the Russian mob, that he must eliminate. Throughout the game, Jacket has visions where he is confronted over his actions by three masked figures: the cryptic rooster-masked Richard, the hostile owl-masked Rasmus, and the sympathetic horse-masked Don Juan.

The personality of the masked figures is seen by who wears them. The owl, Rasmus, is being worn by a member of the Russian mafia. The horse, Don Juan, is worn by a girl that Jacket saves later in the game. The rooster, Richard, is worn by the player, Jacket.

During a raid on the estate of a movie producer, Jacket rescues a woman and brings her home, nursing her back to health and later, building up a relationship with her. In another mission, Jacket is called to a phone company where he finds everyone dead except for a lone biker, whom he fights and subsequently kills. Jacket finds other animal-masked killers dead (or dying) during some of his assignments; after most of them, he visits a store or restaurant where the same bearded clerk greets him. "Beard", as he is dubbed by fans, gives Jacket encouragement and free merchandise such as pizza, movies, and alcohol.

Jacket's perception of reality becomes increasingly surreal, as he begins to see the talking corpses of his victims during his everyday life. "Beard" abruptly dies—his bloody corpse remaining at his places of work—and he is replaced by an abrasive bald man, Richter, who offers Jacket nothing. One day, Jacket arrives home to find his girlfriend murdered and a man in a rat mask on his couch, who shoots him in the chest. It is revealed that everything up to this point was a coma dream; Jacket was put into a coma after being shot and relived the game's events while comatose. He wakes up in a hospital and overhears that his attacker is in police custody, whereupon he escapes and storms Miami police headquarters, killing everyone residing inside.

Jacket discovers his attacker was Richter, who had also been following the orders of threatening messages. Jacket punches Richter and interrogates him. After receiving his information, Jacket steals the file on the police's investigation of the killings. The player can then choose either to kill him by strangulation or to spare him and walk away. Canonically, Jacket decides to spare him, as seen in the sequel. With this, he raids the mob-owned nightclub the calls were tracked to, finding the address of the headquarters of Miami's Russian mafia. Jacket then goes to this address and kills every living thing inside, including the syndicate's leaders.

The game's main story ends with Jacket killing off both of the Russian mafia's leaders. Afterwards, the player can play bonus levels as "Biker" from the telephone company before, during, and after the incident. This leaves the story up to interpretation, as "Biker" wins when you play the fight out as him. Another recipient of the mysterious messages, "Biker" has gotten fed up with carrying out their assignments and is trying to track the callers down. From raiding the phone company, he traces the calls to the mob-owned nightclub. At the nightclub, "Biker" finds a hidden basement, where two people dressed as janitors (they have been lurking throughout multiple levels) have been sending out the mysterious messages. If the player has found secret letters hidden in Jacket's missions, The Biker will crack their computer's password and learn the janitors work for 50 Blessings, an ostensibly peaceful patriotic organisation, and have been using its membership to carry out killings to derail the Russo-American Coalition (an alliance between the Soviet Union and the United States). The Janitors boast their "experiment" is only the "tip of the iceberg" of a larger conspiracy. Without the password, the janitors claim they were acting out of boredom and mock Biker's attempt to rationalise his actions.

Development

Early concept 
Hotline Miami was a spiritual successor to an unreleased game called Super Carnage. Jonatan Söderström started working on the game when he was 18, describing it as a top-down shoot-em-up in which the aim was to kill as many people as possible. The project was cancelled following difficulties programming the game's artificial intelligence's pathfinding. Söderström later met Dennis Wedin, singer and keyboard player in the synthpunk band Fucking Werewolf Asso. They collaborated on a promotional game for the band called Keyboard Drumset Fucking Werewolf, and another game, Life/Death/Island, which was cancelled. Söderström and Wedin decided that their next game would be a commercial release, due to financial difficulties. They saw Super Carnage and its potential as a game. They decided to expand upon this, and thus they started developing Hotline Miami. Immediately after being shown the prototype of Super Carnage, Dennis Wedin was excited to start working on the game. When asked in an interview about his initial thoughts on being shown Söderström's prototype, Wedin stated "I loved it right from the start! I played his prototype for quite a while (even though it was just one level) and that was the most exciting part, making a game that we loved to play ourselves. We never really thought about what anyone else would think, we just wanted to play it and to do that we had to make it".

Inspiration 
The biggest influence on the game's story was David Lynch. Another notable influence on the story was the 2011 film Drive, due to its minimalist plot, lack of dialogue, music and portrayal of violence. Gordon Freeman, the silent protagonist from the Half-Life series, was also of influence due to the protagonist's lack of voice. The documentary Cocaine Cowboys influenced the developer's decision to use 1980s Miami as a setting. On the use of masks, the designers said they were inspired by the movie Kick-Ass and tried to figure out a way where someone without a lot of money would be able to disguise themselves.

Marketing and release 
The cover art was created by Swedish painter Niklas Åkerblad. Leading up to the release of Hotline Miami, Devolver Digital opened a phone line in Miami, Florida to enable people to call and leave voice messages of their own. Some time after the official release of the game in late October 2012, a trailer was created using these recordings. In early November 2012, an update for the game added support for gamepad control, multiple bug fixes, a few gameplay tweaks, graphical adjustments, and a new bonus map called 'Highball'. By mid-December 2012, the game's publisher, Devolver Digital, revealed that 130,000 copies of the game had been sold in the seven weeks since it launched. In an interview at Eurogamer, project manager Graeme Struthers was "chuffed to bits" for Hotline Miami creators Jonatan Söderström and Dennis Wedin, adding that "those are some talented boys."

In an interview with Pocket Gamer, Söderström was quoted as saying that his team had been talking to Sony about bringing the game to PlayStation devices – including the PlayStation Vita – although they would require a third party to port it for them. The creators were also considering porting the game to iOS and Android touchscreen devices. The OS X version was released on 19 March 2013. In mid-February 2013, Devolver Digital and developer Dennaton Games confirmed that the game would be coming to PlayStation 3 and PlayStation Vita in the summer of the same year. The title would be cross-buy, allowing those who have purchased the game on either Vita or PlayStation 3 to play it across both platforms, only having to buy it once. The port was handled by Abstraction Games, who shifted the engine from Game Maker 7 to PhyreEngine, also adding enhanced controls, an extra unlockable mask, and online leaderboards. These features were later added for existing PC owners as a patch. It was also revealed that, at this point, over 300,000 copies of the game had been sold.

On 28 May 2013, it was featured on the eighth Humble Indie Bundle as one of the games offered if paying above the average amount. The Linux version for Hotline Miami was released concurrently with the bundle as at that time. On 24 June 2013, the PlayStation 3 and PlayStation Vita version of Hotline Miami was released early, due to scheduled maintenance of the PlayStation Network. On 24 March 2014, Devolver Digital announced that the game would be headed to the PlayStation 4 with cross-buy support. The PlayStation 4 version of Hotline Miami was released on 19 August 2014.

On 11 September 2014, Overkill Software, the developers of Payday 2, released an announcement that there would be a downloadable content pack based on Hotline Miami, released on 30 September as a collaboration between Dennaton Games and Overkill Software. The content included an expansion named "Hotline Miami" inspired by Hotline Miami itself, and a playable character based on Hotline Miami's Jacket which can be obtained by owning the digital special edition of Hotline Miami 2: Wrong Number.

In Japan, Spike Chunsoft released the localized editions of Hotline Miami and Hotline Miami 2: Wrong Number for the PlayStation 4 and PlayStation Vita bundled together and released as Hotline Miami: Collected Edition on 25 June 2015.

On 19 August 2019, Hotline Miami and Hotline Miami 2: Wrong Number were released on Nintendo Switch as a bundle, called Hotline Miami Collection.

Hotline Miami Collection was ported to Xbox One on 7 April 2020 and to Stadia on 22 September 2020.

Soundtrack 
The Hotline Miami – Official Soundtrack could first be found on Devolver Digital's SoundCloud account. It was later made available to purchase on Valve's digital distribution platform, Steam, as downloadable content for the main game. Although the soundtrack is available for purchase, all of the music files can be found within the game folder in Ogg vorbis format (albeit often in edited versions).

Reception

Critical reception 
Hotline Miami received critical acclaim upon release, with praise given to its neon-soaked depiction of 1980s underground Miami, overflowing with raw brutality and ultraviolent close combat as the player is outgunned and must use wit and cunning to choreograph a way through impossible situations. The game's soundtrack was lauded for accentuating the already heightened tension and gritty violence. Review aggregator website Metacritic gave the PlayStation 3 version 87/100 based on 19 reviews, the PlayStation Vita version 85/100 based on 27 reviews, and the Microsoft Windows version 85/100 based on 51 reviews.

Eurogamer scored the game 10/10, with reviewer Tom Bramwell saying that the game was a blend of elements, all of which are integral to the overall experience.

PopMatters scored the PlayStation 3 version of the game 9/10, and the reviewer Eric Swain wrote "Hotline Miami is still an introspective surrealist dive into the mind of a maniac who lives within the neon gloss of the late '80s. You still go around killing groups of thugs at the behest of a voice on the other side of the phone calls, which is somehow sufficient to addle you into killing everyone you find at an address that that voice provides. You still choose an animal mask to wear before entering these kill zones, and you still have a variety of weapons at your disposal to stab, shoot, and bludgeon your way through crowds of Russian thugs and the police."

IGN gave the game a score of 8.8/10 emphasizing its "striking blend of fast ultraviolence, a dense, challenging story and brilliant presentation." In its final verdict for the game, the reviewer Charles Onyett stated "Hotline Miami momentum of mystery builds right up to its finale, where snarling cynicism is offered as a justification for why all this machinery of neon fuzz and thumping bass, bright blood and fractured identity was started up in the first place. Yet the justification is also disarmingly simple, the same reason why quarters were dropped into arcade machines built during the late '80s era Dennaton Games so clearly reveres. Why bother with Hotline Miami? Because it exists. Because it's fun. Because it deserves to be played."

Awards 
The game received the "Best PC Sound" accolade by IGN from its "Best of 2012" awards. It was also nominated for "Best PC Action Game", "Best PC Story", "Best PC Game", in addition to "Best Overall Action Game", "Best Overall Music", and "Best Overall Game".

It was the recipient of both Eurogamer and Rock, Paper, Shotgun Game of the Show award at their inaugural EGX Rezzed expo. On 24 December 2012, PC Gamer awarded the game with "The Best Music of the Year 2012".

Hotline Miami also won "Best New IP", "Best Gameplay" and "Best Soundtrack" at the 2012 Vidya Gaem Awards, and received several nominations in other categories.

Piracy 
When questioned about piracy issues by Eurogamer, Graeme Struthers of Devolver Digital said "[Söderström] just felt he didn't want people playing the buggy version of his game however they got it. He wanted them to get the patch. He basically said, 'I'm not going to criticise this, it's a fact of life. It would be nice if guys could find it within themselves to pay for it, but that's the world I'm in, so you know, you just have to take it for what it is.' It has been torrented to such a staggering level, and given the file size of it, I mean, you can't really be surprised, right? You could pass this thing around on the world's smallest memory stick. So it has been torrented to extraordinary levels."

Sequel 

In an interview with Jonatan Söderström and Dennis Wedin at Eurogamer, the creators shed some light on possible new future game content. When prompted with the question of upcoming downloadable content, the creators revealed, "I think we're going to do quite a big project. It will probably be about as long as the full game, so probably we'll charge something for it. It will be like a sequel kind of, but building on the story. We don't want to reveal too much, but it will probably have more playable characters than the first game did. And a couple of different stories and angles. A lot of people have been asking about a map editor to build their own stages, so we're looking at if it's possible to do that. I think it would be really cool to let people do their own stages."

In terms of the new soundtrack, Söderström said "I'm not sure for the second game yet. Last time we had nine different musicians doing the soundtrack. Looks like a couple of them might do more tracks for the sequel, but we've been looking at some other bands as well. Want to keep it fresh."

Hinting that the sequel may be some way off, Söderström insisted that he was still committed to working on patching and fixing the original game. The official Hotline Miami Twitter released photographs of the sequel's title screen, revealing its full title: Hotline Miami 2: Wrong Number. On 19 June 2013, the first teaser trailer for the sequel was released on the Devolver Digital YouTube channel. The game was initially announced for 2014, but was eventually released on 10 March 2015.

A Hotline Miami Collection, containing both games, was released for the Nintendo Switch on 19 August 2019, and Xbox One on 7 April 2020.

An 8-part comic book series published by Behemoth Comics titled Hotline Miami: Wildlife, was physically distributed to comic book stores and traditional book stores by Simon & Schuster and Diamond Comic Distributors beginning monthly in September 2020. The comics were originally released digitally in 2016.

See also

References

External links 

 

2012 video games
Action video games
Alternate history video games
Android (operating system) games
Indie video games
Linux games
Nintendo Switch games
Organized crime video games
MacOS games
PhyreEngine games
PlayStation 3 games
PlayStation 4 games
PlayStation Network games
PlayStation Vita games
Single-player video games
Stadia games
Top-down video games
Video games adapted into comics
Video games developed in Sweden
Video games set in 1989
Video games set in Miami
Windows games
Works about the Russian Mafia
Devolver Digital games
GameMaker Studio games
Neo-noir video games
Psychological thriller video games
Xbox One games
Video games with alternate endings
Video games set in Florida